Fengning Manchu Autonomous County (Mölendroff: fengning manju beye dasangga siyan) is a Manchu autonomous county of northern Hebei province, bordering Beijing to the southwest and Inner Mongolia to the north, and lying under the administration of the prefecture-level city of Chengde.

It is the second-largest county of Hebei in terms of area, after the neighbouring Weichang Manchu and Mongol Autonomous County.

Administrative divisions
The county has 9 towns, 16 townships, and one ethnic township under its administration.

Geography

Geology
Fossil-bearing rocks of the Mesozoic Huajiying Formation and/or Yixian Formation occur on the surface. The prehistoric bird Paraprotopteryx was found in such a deposit.

Climate
Fengning has a rather dry, monsoon-influenced humid continental climate (Köppen Dwa), with long, very cold and dry winters, and hot, humid summers, and the elevation depresses temperatures. More than half of the annual precipitation occurs in July and August alone.

Economy

The county draws in many tourists as the Bashang Grasslands in the far north of the county is the nearest grasslands to Beijing. The cultivation of a local tourism is part of a broader regional development policy to support tourism as a primary industry in the Chengde area due to the environmentally friendly character of the industry going well with the goal of preserving the Chengde area's pristine environment, especially compared to the pollution problems besetting the rest of Hebei and also Beijing and Tianjin.

The county's primary tourist attraction are the horse ranches in the Datan grassland. Other highlights are the Dahan Palace of Genghis Khan and the Baiyun Ancient Cave. The height of the tourism season is in July and August when there are bonfire festivities filled with ethnic songs and dances, roasted whole lamb, and staged traditional sporting events like wrestling and archery.

Transport
Both China National Highway 111 and 112 pass through the county, with the former providing direct access to Beijing.

References

External links

County-level divisions of Hebei
Manchu autonomous counties
Chengde